Miroslav Šutej (29 April 1936 – 13 May 2005) was a Croatian avant-garde painter and graphic artist.

Šutej was born in Duga Resa in 1936. He studied painting at the Academy of Fine Arts Zagreb and was an associate in Krsto Hegedušić's master's workshop. Since 1970, Šutej was a professor at the Academy.

Šutej became a full member of the Croatian Academy of Sciences and Arts in 1997.

Šutej was the designer of the modern Croatian flag as well as the banknotes for the Croatian kuna, the Croatian coat of arms, and the jersey pattern of Croatia's national football team.

References

External links
 Miroslav Šutej - Museum of Contemporary Art, Zagreb
 Miroslav Šutej - Tate Modern, London
 Miroslav Šutej - MoMA, New York
 Miroslav Šutej at akademija-art.hr 

1936 births
2005 deaths
People from Duga Resa
Flag designers
Members of the Croatian Academy of Sciences and Arts
Academy of Fine Arts, University of Zagreb alumni
Academic staff of the University of Zagreb
Burials at Mirogoj Cemetery
20th-century Croatian painters
Croatian male painters
20th-century Croatian male artists